Propylene glycol alginate (PGA) is an  emulsifier,  stabilizer, and  thickener used in food products. It is a food additive with E number E405.  Chemically, propylene glycol alginate is an ester of alginic acid, which is derived from kelp.   Some of the carboxyl groups are esterified with propylene glycol, some are neutralized with an appropriate alkali, and some remain free.

See also 
List of food additives, Codex Alimentarius

References

External links
 What is the "propylene glycol alginate" found in salad dressings? at The Straight Dope

Food additives
Carboxylate esters
E-number additives